Lamar Demeatrice Jackson Jr. (born January 7, 1997) is an American football quarterback for the Baltimore Ravens of the National Football League (NFL). He played college football at Louisville, where he won the Heisman Trophy during his sophomore year, and was selected by the Ravens as the final first round pick (#32) of the 2018 NFL Draft. Jackson became the Ravens' starting quarterback in his rookie season after an injury to incumbent Joe Flacco and clinched a division title with the team, also becoming the youngest NFL quarterback to start a playoff game at age 21.

The next year, Jackson set the season record for quarterback rushing yards and led the league in touchdown passes while bringing the Ravens to the top seed of the American Football Conference (AFC). For his success, he became the second unanimous Most Valuable Player (MVP) and the fourth African-American quarterback to win the award. Jackson followed up his MVP campaign by becoming the first quarterback to have multiple 1,000 yards rushing seasons and led the Ravens to a third consecutive playoff appearance.

Early years
Jackson was born to Felicia Jones and Lamar Jackson Sr. on January 7, 1997. He grew up in the center of an economically distressed section of Pompano Beach, Florida. Jackson's father died from a heart attack on the same day his grandmother died in 2005, when Jackson was 8 years old. His siblings and he were raised by their mother.

He attended public schools and played Pop Warner football in the same Florida league with future teammate Marquise Brown. When he was 8 years old, Jackson could throw a football 20 yards. In high school, Jackson threw a football 100 yards.

High school career

Jackson was a standout quarterback at Boynton Beach High School in Boynton Beach, Florida. At Boynton Beach, Jackson was a successful read-option quarterback who could run and throw the ball equally well. He improved passing accuracy and decision-making by watching hours of film each week. In two years at Boynton Beach, Jackson threw for 2,263 yards and 31 touchdowns with nine interceptions. Additionally, he ran for 1,624 yards and 22 touchdowns, and had a quarterback rating of 102.7. Jackson's last high school game came against a nationally ranked Miami Central High School team during the first round of the 2014 Florida High School Football Playoff 6A tournament. Boynton Beach was soundly defeated 49–6, with Jackson throwing two interceptions. He also competed for his high school track team, posting a personal record of 11.45 seconds in the 100 meter dash in one track meet. Jackson was named the Lou Groza Palm Beach County High School Player of the Year in 2014.

Recruiting 
Jackson was rated three stars by ESPN.com and 247Sports, but four stars by Rivals.com. Despite the disagreement by recruiting companies over his caliber, he received offers from both Power Five schools like Louisville, Florida, Auburn, and Clemson, and mid-major programs like Akron, Western Kentucky, and Marshall. All of the major recruiting companies listed Jackson as a top 20 dual-threat quarterback, with 247Sports ranking him as high as #12. Jackson's in-state ranking also varied greatly, from as high as #51 from Rivals to as low as #80 by ESPN. Jackson visited only four schools (Louisville, Florida, Nebraska, and Mississippi State), and after it appeared he might sign with Florida, Jackson ultimately committed to the University of Louisville after head coach Bobby Petrino promised Jackson's mother that her son would be playing quarterback and nothing else.

College career

2015 season 
As a freshman at Louisville in 2015 (he was a communications major), Jackson played in 12 games and made eight starts in the Cardinals' 8–5 season. He completed 135-of-247 passes for 1,840 yards with 12 touchdowns and eight interceptions and ran for 960 yards and 11 rushing touchdowns. He was named the MVP of the 2015 Music City Bowl after passing for 227 yards with two touchdowns and rushing for a Music City Bowl-record 226 yards and two touchdowns.

2016 season
During the first game of his sophomore year, against the Charlotte 49ers, Jackson set a university record for total touchdowns with eight, all of them in the first half. Against Syracuse, Jackson completed 20 of 39 passes for 411 yards, one touchdown, and one interception, with 199 rushing yards and four rushing touchdowns, with all five touchdowns coming in the first half as the Cardinals routed the Orange 62–28. One of those touchdowns came when he hurdled over a Syracuse defender into the end zone.

Against #2 Florida State, Jackson completed 13 of 20 passes for 216 yards, threw one touchdown and one interception, and had 146 rushing yards and four rushing touchdowns. He scored four of the five total touchdowns in the first half in a 63–20 route of the Seminoles, the most points that the Seminoles had ever surrendered at the time. The game made Jackson the Heisman front runner, and gave the Cardinals a No. 3 ranking, their highest since 2006. Against Marshall, Jackson completed 24 of 44 passes for 417 yards and five touchdowns, and had 62 rushing yards and two rushing touchdowns. Against No. 5 Clemson, Louisville's offense totaled 586 yards, with Jackson accounting for 295 passing yards, 162 rushing yards, and three total touchdowns (one passing, two rushing). The Cardinals eventually lost the game 42–36. On December 8, Jackson was awarded the Walter Camp Award as the player of the year and the Maxwell Award as the best all-around player in college football.

On December 10, 2016, Jackson was selected as the 2016 Heisman Trophy winner over fellow finalists Deshaun Watson, Dede Westbrook, Jabrill Peppers, and Baker Mayfield. He became Louisville's first Heisman Trophy winner in school history, and the youngest-ever recipient of the award at the age of 19 years and 337 days. Jackson finished Louisville's 9–4 season with 3,543 passing yards, 30 passing touchdowns, and nine interceptions to go along with 260 carries for 1,571 rushing yards and 21 rushing touchdowns.

Aside from nationally recognized awards, Jackson also won prestigious awards within the University of Louisville. In 2017, Jackson won a Louie for being named the Adidas High Performance Male Athlete of the Year for his outstanding sophomore campaign. He also won a Louie for Play of the Year after the leap he made in the 2016 Syracuse game.

2017 season
When Jackson entered the 2017 season, his fan base and media had high expectations of his performance. College GameDay announced their return to the University of Louisville to host the opening matchup on September 16 between the returning National Champions, Clemson Tigers, and the Cardinals. Despite the 47–21 blowout the Tigers achieved, Jackson did not let the numbers affect his playing ability. His remarkable statistics for the season resulted in his being a Heisman finalist for the 2017 season. He finished in third place in the Heisman voting, losing out to Baker Mayfield and Bryce Love. Jackson played in 13 games, finishing with 3,660 passing yards, 27 passing touchdowns, and 10 interceptions to go along with 232 carries for 1,601 rushing yards and 18 rushing touchdowns in the Cardinals' 8–5 season.

Following the 2017–18 school year, Jackson was named the men's ACC Athlete of the Year for all conference sports, sharing honors with women's winner Arike Ogunbowale of Notre Dame basketball.

Collegiate statistics

Professional career
On January 5, 2018, Jackson announced that he would enter the 2018 NFL Draft. Some draft pundits doubted Jackson's quarterback abilities and suggested that he switch positions to wide receiver due to his athleticism, but he remained adamant about his intention to play quarterback professionally. He declined to run drills such as the 40-yard dash during the NFL Scouting Combine, in order to focus on displaying his passing skills. Jackson reportedly clocked in a 4.34 40 yard dash time in 2017 at Louisville which would have been the fastest time in NFL history for a quarterback.

Jackson was drafted by the Baltimore Ravens in the first round with the 32nd overall pick in the draft, after trading up for the selection with the Philadelphia Eagles. He was the fifth quarterback selected that year. On June 5, 2018, Jackson signed his rookie contract, reportedly worth $9.47 million with a $4.97 million signing bonus.

2018 season
Jackson made his NFL debut relieving starting quarterback Joe Flacco in the second half of a 47–3 victory against the Buffalo Bills, finishing with 24 passing yards and 39 rushing yards, in the season opener. During Week 7, Jackson scored his first NFL touchdown on a 1-yard run as the Ravens narrowly lost to the New Orleans Saints by a score of 23–24. Jackson threw his first NFL touchdown pass, a 26-yard completion to fellow rookie tight end Hayden Hurst, the next week in relief of Flacco in the fourth quarter of a 36–21 loss to the Carolina Panthers.

On November 18, 2018, Jackson made his first NFL start against the Cincinnati Bengals in place of the injured Joe Flacco, who injured his hip two weeks prior against the Pittsburgh Steelers. Jackson went 13 for 19 for 150 yards and an interception and rushed for 117 yards, which was a Ravens franchise record for rushing yards by a quarterback in a single game in a 24–21 victory. The following week against the Oakland Raiders, Jackson threw for 178 yards, one touchdown, and two interceptions. He also rushed for 71 yards and a rushing touchdown. The Ravens won by a score of 34–17. During Week 13 against the Atlanta Falcons, Jackson passed for 125 yards and rushed for 75 yards and a touchdown in a 26–16 victory. In a Week 14 24–27 overtime loss to the Kansas City Chiefs, Jackson threw two touchdowns for the first time in his career.

Jackson helped the Ravens defeat the Los Angeles Chargers in Week 16, completing 12 of 22 passes for 204 yards and a touchdown in a 22–10 upset victory. The following week against fellow rookie quarterback Baker Mayfield and the Cleveland Browns, Jackson passed for 179 yards and rushed for two touchdowns on 95 rushing yards, despite fumbling a third potential touchdown at the goal line, as the Ravens beat the Browns 26–24 to clinch the AFC North title. In the seven regular season games in which Jackson had started, the Ravens went 6–1 to close out the 2018 season. Overall, he finished the season with 1,201 passing yards, six passing touchdowns, and three interceptions. In addition, he led all quarterbacks with 695 rushing yards and added five rushing touchdowns.

Postseason
Taking the field the day before his 22nd birthday, Jackson became the youngest quarterback start an NFL playoff game in a Wild Card rematch against the Chargers. Despite being held to just 25 passing yards at one point in the fourth quarter by a stout Chargers defense, Jackson then passed for two touchdowns in four minutes to bring the Ravens back from a 20-point deficit to within a touchdown. After forcing the Chargers to punt with less than a minute left, the Ravens had one last chance to win the game down six points, but Jackson was strip-sacked by Chargers linebacker Uchenna Nwosu. With the Chargers recovering the ball, the Ravens lost 23–17 and were knocked out of the playoffs. He finished the game completing 14 of 29 passes for 194 yards, the two aforementioned touchdowns, and an interception while rushing for 54 yards, losing one fumble.

Once the 2018 season was over, the Ravens's coaching staff decided to abandon the offensive strategy that had been designed for Joe Flacco and create a new offensive philosophy centered around the specific skills of Jackson. That philosophy included changing every play in the playbook, the terminology used and drafting players or acquiring free agents that would complement Jackson's skills.

2019 season: Unanimous NFL MVP
In the season-opener against the Miami Dolphins, Jackson went 17 of 20 for career-highs of 324 yards and five touchdowns, making him the youngest quarterback to achieve a perfect passer rating in the 59–10 road victory. He was named the AFC Offensive Player of the Week for his performance. During Week 2 against the Arizona Cardinals, Jackson rushed for 120 yards and threw for 272 yards and two touchdowns, as the Ravens won by a score of 23–17. His two touchdown passes set the Ravens' franchise record for the most touchdown passes in the team's first two games of a season. Jackson became the first player in NFL history to pass for more than 250 yards and rush for 120 yards in one game.

During Week 6 against the Cincinnati Bengals, Jackson finished with 236 passing yards, 152 rushing yards, and a rushing touchdown as the Ravens won 23–17. He also became the first player in NFL history to pass for more than 200 yards and rush for 150 yards in a regular-season game, and had more rushing yards than any player at any position in Week 6. During Week 7 against the Seattle Seahawks, Jackson finished with 143 passing yards and 116 rushing yards with a rushing touchdown as the Ravens won 30–16. After a Week 8 bye, the Ravens faced the unbeaten New England Patriots. In that game, Jackson threw for 163 yards and a touchdown and rushed for 61 yards and two touchdowns in the 37–20 victory. For his performance, Jackson earned his second AFC Offensive Player of the Week award.

In the next game, the Ravens routed the Bengals 49–13 with Jackson throwing for 223 yards and three touchdowns and rushing for 65 yards and a touchdown, finishing with a perfect passer rating. He became only the second player in NFL history to produce two perfect passer ratings in the same season. Jackson joined Aaron Rodgers (2019) and Joe Montana (1989) as the only players in the Super Bowl era with 15-plus completions, 3-plus passing touchdowns, 1-plus rushing touchdowns, and a perfect passer rating in a single game. Jackson also earned his third total, and second consecutive, AFC Offensive Player of the Week award, matching his predecessor Joe Flacco's career total.

During Week 11 against the Houston Texans, Jackson became the first quarterback in franchise history to throw four or more touchdowns in a game multiple times during the regular season after he threw for 222 yards and four touchdowns in a 41–7 victory. Jackson also rushed for 86 yards during the victory over the Texans, making him the only quarterback in NFL history to rush for more than 60 yards in seven consecutive games. In the next game against the Los Angeles Rams, Jackson threw for 169 yards and five touchdowns in the 45–6 road victory, making him the first player with that many touchdowns in a Monday Night Football debut and the youngest player with multiple five touchdown passing games in NFL history. He earned his fourth AFC Offensive Player of the Week award due to his performance. He was named the AFC's Player of the Month for November. In the next game against the San Francisco 49ers, Jackson finished with 105 passing yards, 101 rushing yards, and two total touchdowns as the Ravens won 20–17, and Jackson became the first quarterback in NFL history with four 100-yard rushing games in a season. In Week 14, in the 24–17 victory over the Buffalo Bills, Jackson became the first quarterback since Michael Vick to rush for 1,000 yards in a single season.

Against the New York Jets in Week 15, Jackson had 212 passing yards for five touchdowns, and eight rushes for 86 yards during the 42–21 win, breaking Vick's single-season rushing record for a quarterback. His five passing touchdowns in the game made him the sixth player since the merger to have three games with at least five passing touchdowns in a season, and tied the Ravens franchise season record with 33. After his performance against the Jets, Jackson was named AFC Player of the Week for week 15. In Week 16 against the Cleveland Browns, Jackson was held to 38 passing yards and a lost fumble in the first 28 minutes, before exploding for 142 yards and two touchdowns in the last two minutes before halftime. He added a third touchdown pass in the second half of the 31–15 win, setting the Ravens single season record for touchdown passes at 36, finishing with 238 passing yards and 103 rushing yards. On the day after the Ravens' victory over the Browns, and due to the Ravens' having clinched home-field advantage, head coach John Harbaugh announced that Jackson, guard Marshal Yanda, safety Earl Thomas and defensive tackle Brandon Williams would be inactive for the Week 17 game against the Pittsburgh Steelers. Even without playing in the Ravens' final game, Jackson  led all quarterbacks with 36 touchdown passes and a QBR of 81.10; he also led all rushers with a 6.9 yards per carry average. During the 2019 season he was also first with 43 total touchdowns and a 9.0 passing touchdown percentage.

Jackson was the starting quarterback at the 2020 Pro Bowl in Orlando, Florida. He threw for 185 yards and two touchdowns with one interception and was named the offensive Most Valuable Player. He became the youngest quarterback in NFL history to start a Pro Bowl game.

Jackson was voted the MVP of the 2019 season. He became the second player after Tom Brady in 2010 to be voted unanimously and the second-youngest player to win, behind only Jim Brown. Jackson, along with Patrick Mahomes, Cam Newton and Steve McNair, is one of the four African-American quarterbacks to win the AP MVP award.

Postseason

In the Divisional Round versus the Tennessee Titans, Jackson and the Ravens were not able to recreate the same success that they had in the regular season, losing 28–12. Jackson finished the game completing 31 of 59 passes for 365 yards, one touchdown and two interceptions while also losing a fumble on a strip sack. He also rushed 20 times for 143 yards becoming the first player to throw for 300+ yards and rush for 100+ yards in a playoff game. In total, Jackson personally accounted for over 500 yards of offense.

2020 season

In the season-opener against the Cleveland Browns, Jackson went 20 for 25 for 275 yards and three touchdowns in the Ravens 38–6 victory. He was named the AFC Offensive Player of the Week due to his performance. In Week 3 against the Kansas City Chiefs, Jackson threw for a career-low 97 yards and a touchdown during the 20–34 loss. In the Ravens Week 4 31–17 victory over the Washington Football Team, Jackson threw for 193 yards and two touchdowns, and rushed for 52 yards and one touchdown, making him the fastest player in NFL history to reach 5,000 yards passing and 2,000 yards rushing. In Week 8 against the Pittsburgh Steelers, Jackson threw for 208 yards and two touchdowns, but also threw two interceptions, including his first career pick six, and lost two fumbles during the 24–28 loss. On November 26, 2020, Jackson tested positive for COVID-19 and was placed on the reserve/COVID-19 list. He was activated on December 7.

Jackson made his return in Week 13 against the Dallas Cowboys. During the game, Jackson threw for 107 yards, two touchdowns, and an interception and rushed for 94 yards and a touchdown in the 34–17 win. The next week, Jackson set an NFL record for the most rushing yards by a quarterback on Monday Night Football as he rushed for 124 yards in a thriller against the Cleveland Browns. However, Jackson then left the game late in the third quarter due to leg cramps. He was out of the game for most of the fourth quarter, and Cleveland was able to come back from 14-down and take a 35–34 lead. After backup Trace McSorley suffered a left knee sprain with two minutes left in regulation, Jackson re-entered the game and, on 4th down and 5, threw a 44-yard touchdown pass to Marquise Brown. After the Browns drove down and tied the game at 42, Jackson followed up with a short drive to get the Ravens into field goal range, allowing them to get the win by the score of 47–42. Jackson had two rushing touchdowns and a passing touchdown in the game and was named the AFC Offensive Player of the Week for his performance in Week 14. In Week 15 against the Jacksonville Jaguars, Jackson threw for 243 yards, three touchdowns, and one interception and rushed for 35 yards and a touchdown during the 40–14 win. In Week 17 against the Cincinnati Bengals, Jackson threw for 113 yards, three touchdowns, and one interception and rushed for 97 yards during the 38–3 win. During the game, Jackson became the first NFL quarterback to have multiple seasons surpassing 1,000 rushing yards.

Postseason
In the Wild Card Round, Jackson won his first career playoff game by defeating the Tennessee Titans in a rematch of the previous year's Divisional Round matchup. He threw for 179 yards and one interception and rushed for 136 yards and a touchdown during the 20–13 win. In the Divisional Round against the Buffalo Bills, Jackson threw for 162 yards and rushed for 34 yards, but threw a costly red zone pick-six to Taron Johnson late in third quarter. He then sustained a concussion on the last play of the third quarter, effectively ending his season as the Ravens would lose 17–3.

2021 season

On April 30, 2021, the Ravens exercised the fifth-year option on Jackson's contract, worth a guaranteed $23 million for the 2022 season. Jackson was diagnosed with COVID-19 around the start of training camp, the second time he had contracted the virus.

In Week 1, against the Las Vegas Raiders, Jackson finished with 235 passing yards, 86 rushing yards, a passing touchdown, but also lost two of three fumbles as the Ravens lost in overtime 27–33. Against the Kansas City Chiefs in Week 2, Jackson finished with 239 passing yards, 107 rushing yards, two interceptions, and three total touchdowns as the Ravens won 36–35, marking Jackson's first win over Patrick Mahomes. In Week 3, against the Detroit Lions, Jackson finished with 287 passing yards, 58 rushing yards, a passing touchdown in a close 19–17 win, as Ravens kicker Justin Tucker made an NFL record 66-yard field goal in the last seconds to win the game. In Week 5 against the Indianapolis Colts, Jackson threw for a career-high and Ravens franchise record 442 yards and four touchdowns while also rushing for 62 yards, helping the Ravens erase a 19-point deficit and win in overtime 31–25. Jackson also became the first quarterback to have a 85%+ completion rate while throwing 40+ passes. Ravens coach John Harbaugh called it one of the greatest performances he had ever seen. The next week, Jackson set the record for the most victories as a starting quarterback under the age of 25 at 35 in 34–6 rout of the Los Angeles Chargers. In Week 12 against the Cleveland Browns, Jackson threw a career high four interceptions. However, the Ravens outmatched the Browns winning 16–10. Against the Browns in Week 14, Jackson suffered an ankle injury after being hit by Jeremiah Owusu-Koramoah in the first quarter and was ruled out during the 22–24 loss. He missed the remainder of the game and, ultimately, the rest of the season. Jackson was named to his second Pro Bowl after his first coming of his unanimous MVP season.

2022 season
Jackson turned down a contract extension due to his belief that he could improve and earn more. In week 2 against the Miami Dolphins, Jackson threw for 318 yards, three touchdowns, and rushed for 119 yards and a touchdown in the 38–42 loss. In the game, Jackson surpassed Michael Vick for the most 100-yard rushing games by a quarterback. For the first month of the 2022 NFL season, Jackson led the league in quarterback rating (119.0) and passing touchdowns (10). In addition, Jackson ran for two touchdowns. His 12 combined touchdowns were more than the number of touchdowns scored by 30 NFL teams to that point in the season.  As a result, Jackson was named the AFC Offensive Player of the Month. In Week 6 against the New York Giants Jackson suffered his first loss to an NFC opponent, having been 12–0 previously. 

In Week 13 against the Denver Broncos, Jackson suffered a sprained PCL when he was sacked by Jonathon Cooper. Despite an initial timetable of one to three weeks for his PCL injury, Jackson missed the final five games of the regular season as the Ravens finished 10–7, good enough for the fifth seed in the playoffs. On January 13, Jackson was ruled out for the Ravens' Wild Card game against the Cincinnati Bengals.

2023 season
On March 7, 2023, the Ravens placed the non-exclusive franchise tag on Jackson.

Player profile 
Jackson has been widely regarded as the best running quarterback in the NFL since his rookie season. His dual-threat style of play has often earned him comparisons to Michael Vick. Except for his rookie season, the Ravens have led the league in rushing each year with Jackson under center. In 2019, the Ravens broke the single-season rushing record, with Jackson breaking Vick's record for most rushing yards by a quarterback in a single season.

Concerns, however, have been raised on his ability to play as a pure pocket passer when the run game is contained. Jackson's passing concerns began during his college tenure with Louisville. Over the years, most analysts have cited improvement in his passing ability, but he is rarely mentioned with the elite passers in the league.

NFL career statistics

Regular season

Postseason

Awards and highlights

College

NCAA Football
 Heisman Trophy (2016)
 Maxwell Award (2016)
 Walter Camp Award (2016)
 Associated Press Player of the Year (2016)
 Sporting News Player of the Year (2016)
 Unanimous All-American (2016)
 2× ACC Player of the Year (2016, 2017)
 2× ACC Offensive Player of the Year (2016, 2017)
 ACC Athlete of the Year (2018)

Louisville Cardinals football
 Unanimous selection to Louisville Cardinals Team of the Decade (2010–2019)
 Most career rushing attempts by a quarterback: 655 (2015–2017)
 Most career rushing yards: 4,132 (2015–2017)
 Most career rushing touchdowns: 50 (2015–2017)
 Most passing touchdowns in a game: 6 (tied with Chris Redman) (2016)
 Number 8 retired by the Louisville Cardinals

NFL
 NFL Most Valuable Player (2019)
 Bert Bell Award (2019)
 8× AFC Offensive Player of the Week (2019: Week 1, Week 9, Week 10, Week 12, Week 15) (2020: Week 1, Week 14) (2021: Week 5)
 3x AFC Offensive Player of the Month (December 2018) (November 2019)(September 2022)
 Kansas City Committee of 101 awards AFC Offensive Player of the Year (2019)
 Pro Bowl (2019)

 First-team All-Pro (2019)
 Sporting News Offensive Player of the Year (2019)
 NFL Top 100 rankings: #1 (2020), #24 (2021), #36 (2022)

NFL records
 First quarterback with multiple 1,000-yard rushing seasons: (2019, 2020)
 First quarterback with 4, 700+ rushing yards seasons in a career: (2019, 2020, 2021, 2022)
 First player with 3,000 passing yards and 1,000 rushing yards in a season: (2019)
 Most rushing yards by a quarterback in a season: 1,206 (2019)
 Most rushing attempts by a quarterback in a season: 159 (2019)
 Most 100+ rushing yards games by a quarterback in a season: 5 (2019)
 Most career 100+ rushing yards games by a quarterback: 12 
 Most perfect passer ratings in a season (tied with Ben Roethlisberger): 2 (2019)
 Most wins by a quarterback under the age of 25: 35
 Youngest quarterback to ever start a playoff game: 21 years, 364 days (2018 Wild Card Round against the Los Angeles Chargers)
 Youngest quarterback to achieve a perfect passer rating: 22 years, 244 days (Week 1, 2019)
 Highest completion percentage in a game when attempting more than 40 passes: 86% (Week 5, 2021)

Ravens franchise records
 Most passing yards by a quarterback in a game: 442 (Week 5, 2021)
 Most rushing yards by a quarterback in a game: 152 (Week 6, 2019)
 Most passing touchdowns in a season: 36 (2019)
 Most games with a perfect passer rating: 2
 Most passing touchdowns in a game: 5 (tied with Joe Flacco and Tony Banks)
 Most consecutive games with a touchdown pass: 15
 Highest completion percentage in a game: 88.2
 Highest completion percentage in a season: 66.1 (2019)
 Highest completion percentage, career: 64.0 (2018–2020)
 Highest passer rating, season: 113.3 (2019)
 Highest passer rating, career: 102.6 (2018–2020)
 Lowest percentage of passes intercepted, season: 1.5 (2019)
 Lowest percentage of passes intercepted, career: 1.6 (2018–2019)

In popular culture

Prior to the start of the 2019 NFL season, Jackson appeared on ABC's Celebrity Family Feud, pitting current NFL players against former NFL players. During the 2019 NFL season, Jackson's Madden NFL character speed was upgraded to 96, making Jackson the fastest quarterback in that game's history. Jackson was the cover athlete in the Madden NFL 21 video game.

In 2019, Pope Francis was gifted a signed Lamar Jackson Ravens jersey.

In February 2020, BET Digital highlighted Jackson as one of 40 of the most inspiring and innovative vanguards in African American culture and who are redefining what it means to be "unapologetically young, gifted & Black".

Personal life
As of 2019, Jackson lives in Owings Mills, Maryland, about 20 minutes from the Ravens training complex with his mother, brother, and sisters. Adoree' Jackson is his first cousin once removed. As a child, Jackson's favorite player was Michael Vick. Vick inspired Jackson to mould his dual-threat style of play to his advantage as a quarterback in the NFL.

Business ventures 
In 2018, Jackson announced the launch of his sportswear line, Era 8 Apparel. In March 2020, Jackson filed a federal lawsuit against Amazon, charging the corporate giant with engaging in the “deliberate and unauthorized use” of Jackson's name, image and persona. The suit also alleges that Amazon had unlawfully infringed on his right of publicity in connection with alleged “false advertising and endorsement of unlicensed and infringing articles of clothing.”

In August 2020, Jackson signed an endorsement deal with Oakley, Inc., a company that produces sunglasses, sports goggles and football helmet visors.

In May 2022, it was announced that Jackson had entered the restaurant business with the purchase of a soul food restaurant in his home state of Florida. Tasty's Soul Food Sports Bar & Grill in Pompano Beach will change its name to Play Action Soulfood and More; and asking the question "You 8 yet?"

In September 2022, Jackson posted on his Twitter that he will be the cover star of NFL's first virtual reality (VR) game. "NFL Pro Era" is the first VR NFL game is said to let users 'experience what it's like to compete as the QB of their favorite NFL team.' The game is slated to launch September 15, 2022, on PlayStation VR and Meta Quest.

See also
 List of NCAA major college football yearly total offense leaders
 List of NCAA Division I FBS career rushing touchdowns leaders

Notes

References

External links

 
 Baltimore Ravens bio
 Louisville Cardinals bio
 
 
 

1997 births
Living people
African-American Christians
African-American players of American football
All-American college football players
American Conference Pro Bowl players
American football quarterbacks
American philanthropists
Baltimore Ravens players
Heisman Trophy winners
Louisville Cardinals football players
Maxwell Award winners
National Football League Most Valuable Player Award winners
People from Owings Mills, Maryland
People from Pompano Beach, Florida
Players of American football from Florida
Sportspeople from Boynton Beach, Florida